Henrique Anjos (6 April 1952 – 17 May 1993) was a Portuguese sailor. He competed at the 1972 Summer Olympics, the 1984 Summer Olympics, and the 1988 Summer Olympics.

References

External links
 

1952 births
1993 deaths
Portuguese male sailors (sport)
Olympic sailors of Portugal
Sailors at the 1972 Summer Olympics – Star
Sailors at the 1984 Summer Olympics – Star
Sailors at the 1988 Summer Olympics – Star
Sportspeople from Lisbon